Ulèë Lheuë is an area in Meuraxa sub-district, Banda Aceh, Indonesia. It was the former main seaport of Aceh. The town and seaport was heavily damaged and depopulated during the 2004 Indian Ocean earthquake and tsunami.

Description 
Ulèë Lheuë is made of two words - Ulèë means "head" and "lheuë" means little peninsula.

The town was most popular during the reign of Aceh Sultanate as a busy international seaport for spice trading.

Ulèë Lheuë was devastated by the 2004 Indian Ocean earthquake and tsunami—the majority of the town's buildings were destroyed, and less than 10% of the pre-tsunami population of 6000 survived. The area was reconstructed in 2005. A new ferry terminal has been built, funded by the Australian Government (implemented by UNDP).

One notable building to survive the tsunami is the 17th-century Baiturrahim Mosque.

See also
2004 Indian Ocean earthquake and tsunami

References

Ports and harbours of Indonesia
Populated places in Aceh